Golden Time of Day is the second album by  Bay Area-based R&B group Maze.  Released in 1978 on Capitol Records.

Track listing
All tracks written by Frankie Beverly.

"Travelin' Man" – 5:06
"Song for My Mother" – 5:02
"You're Not The Same" – 5:13
"Workin' Together" – 5:30
"Golden Time of Day" – 5:30
"I Wish You Well" – 4:37
"I Need You" – 10:00

Charts

Weekly charts

Year-end charts

Singles

References

External links
 Maze Featuring Frankie Beverly -Golden Time Of Day at Discogs

1978 albums
Maze (band) albums
Capitol Records albums